The Yankee Doodle Bridge carries Interstate 95 (Connecticut Turnpike) over the Norwalk River in Norwalk in the U.S. state of Connecticut.

References

Interstate 95
Road bridges in Connecticut
Bridges on the Interstate Highway System
Former toll bridges in Connecticut